Natalie King  (born 1966) is an Australian curator and writer working in Melbourne, Australia. She specializes in Australian and international programs for contemporary art and visual culture. This includes exhibitions, publications, workshops, lectures and cultural partnerships across contemporary art and indigenous culture.

King was formerly Chief Curator of Melbourne Biennial Lab, the Creative Associate of MPavilion and curator of Tracey Moffatt for the Australian Pavilion at the 57th International Art Exhibition, Venice Biennale 2017.

As from 2017, she is a senior research fellow at the Victorian College of the Arts, University of Melbourne, Australia and was recently appointed to the role of enterprise professor at the VCA. In that role she was named in The Australian Financial Review 100 Women of Influence awards for Arts, Culture and Sport in October 2018. In September 2019, King was appointed as curator of the first Pacific and transgender artist, Yuki Kihara, to represent Aotearoa New Zealand at the 59th Venice Biennale 2021.

Early life
Natalie King grew up in North Balwyn, Melbourne Victoria, in a conventional Jewish household. From a young age she had an interest in the indigenous history of the city, including the work of Aboriginal artist Destiny Deacon and long-time collaborator Virginia Fraser.

Career

Venice Biennale
Natalie King curated Tracey Moffatt for the Australian pavilion at the 57th International Art Exhibition, Venice Biennale 2017.

Other institutions and projects
Her previous roles include Chief Curator of Melbourne Biennial Lab, City of Melbourne; senior research fellow, Victorian College of the Arts, The University of Melbourne and Creative Associate of MPavilion.

Achievements
In 2018, Natalie King was selected as a finalist for the Australian Financial Review 100 Women of Influence. The award was established to recognize the achievements of Australian women across a broad range of professions and disciplines.

In the 2020 Queen's Birthday Honours, King was awarded the Medal of the Order of Australia (OAM) for "service to the contemporary visual arts".

Education
King completed a Master of Arts (M.A.), Visual Arts & Museum Studies at Monash University in Victoria Australia, between 1991 and 1993.

Publications
Natalie King is co-editor (with Professor Larissa Hjorth and Mami Kataoka) of the anthology Art in the Asia Pacific: Intimate Publics, Routledge, 2014. She is also editor/curator of Up Close: Carol Jerrems with Larry Clark, Nan Goldin and William Yang, Heide Museum of Modern Art. King also co-edited a publication on biennial curator Hou Hanru. She is widely published in arts media including LEAP, Photofile and Flash Art.
She is also a member of the International Association of Art Critics, Paris.

 Tracey Moffatt: My Horizon, by Natalie King, Thames & Hudson, 1 May 2017 
 Whisper in my mask: TarraWarra Biennial 2014, edited by Natalie King and Djon Mundine, TarraWarra, 2014, 
 Hou Hanru, edited by Natalie King and Victoria Lynn, University of Melbourne, 2013, 
 Jitish Kallat: Circa, edited by Natalie King and Bala Starr, University of Melbourne, 2012, 
 Shadowlife, curated by Djon Mundine and Natalie King, Asialink, 2012, 
 Up Close: Carol Jerrems with Larry Clark, Nan Goldin and William Yang, Edited by Natalie King, 31 August 2010 
 Destiny Deacon: Walk & don't look blak, curated by Natalie King, Museum of Contemporary Art, 2004,

Select curated exhibitions
 2017, My Horizon: Tracey Moffatt, Australian Pavilion, 57th Venice Biennale, Venice
 2016, Monyet Gila: Episode One – The Episode with the Crazy Monkey, Contemporary Asian Art, Sydney, co-curated with Mikala Tai
 2016, Melbourne Biennial Lab: What happens now?, Melbourne Festival
 2016, Conversations: Endless Acts in Human History, Entang Wiharso and Sally Smart, National Gallery of Indonesia, Jakarta, co-curated with Suwarno Wisetrotomo
 2014, One Night Stand: Slow Art Collective & The Telepathy Project, MPavilion, Melbourne
 2014, Whisper in My Mask: TarraWarra Biennial 2014 (with Djon Mundine), TarraWarra Museum of Art, Victoria
 2014, Episodes: Australian Photography Now 13th Dong Gang International Photo Festival 2014, Dong Gang Museum of Photography, Korea
 2013, Jitish Kallat: Circa, Ian Potter Museum of Art, Melbourne, co-curated with Bala Starr and Andrew Jamieson
 2012, Shadowlife (with Djon Mundine), Bangkok Arts & Cultural Centre; Kaohsiung Museum of Fine Arts, Taiwan; Nanyang Academy of Fine Art, Singapore; Bendigo Art Gallery, Victoria
 2012, Gigi Scaria: Prisms of Perception, Ian Potter Museum of Art, Melbourne, co-curated with Bala Starr
 2010, Up Close: Carol Jerrems with Larry Clark, Nan Goldin & William Yang, Heide Museum of Modern Art, Melbourne
 2004, Destiny Deacon: Walk & don’t look blak,  Adam Art Gallery, Wellington; Tjibaou Cultural Centre, New Caledonia; Tokyo Metropolitan Museum of Photography, Japan and Ian Potter Museum of Art, Melbourne, Museum of Contemporary Art, Sydney
 2004, Supernatural Artificial, Tokyo Metropolitan Museum of Photography, Japan
 1999, aero-zone, Rosemary Laing, National Museum of Art, Osaka, Australian Centre for Contemporary Art, Melbourne
 1994, Primavera 1994: Young Australian Artists, Museum of Contemporary Art, Sydney

Selected interviews
Natalie King has conducted a number of public lectures and published interviews with leading international artists and curators including:

 Curator Natalie King on her new role as Enterprise Professor at the VCA, The University of Melbourne, 2018
 Pipilotti Rist – artist (Switzerland), 8 January 2018
 Tracey Moffatt – artist (Australia), 1 September 2017
 Maria Alyokhina – a founding member of Pussy riot (Russia), 17 August 2017
 Entang Wiharso and Sally Smart – artists (Australia), 20 January 2016
 Interview with Raqs Media Collective, Boiler Room Lecture, State Library of Victoria, Melbourne, 2015
 Falling back to Earth: Cai Guo-Qiang, Art and Australia, 2014, pp. 508–513
 Interview with Hou Hanru, Asialink, University of Melbourne, 2013
 A Human Texture: The video portraits of Candice Breitz, Art and Australia, Vol 51 No 2, Summer 2013, pp. 191–5
 Polixeni Papapetrou – artist (Australia), 2013
 Bill Henson – artist (Australia), 2011
 The Material of meaning: Illuminating the art of Joseph Kosuth, Art and Australia, Vol. 47, No. 4, Winter 2010, pp. 590–595
 Anastasia Klose – artist (Australia), 2009
 Interview with Carolyn Christov-Bakargiev, Flash Art, May–June 2008, p. 86
 Interview with Ai Weiwei, Art and Australia, Vol. 45 No. 4, 2008, pp. 546–549
 Interview with Massimiliano Gioni, Art and Australia, Vol. 45, No. 2, Summer 2007, pp. 274–9

References

External links

"Tracey Moffatt in Conversation with Natalie King, South Australia", Australia Council for the Arts 12 May 2016

Writers from Melbourne
1966 births
Australian curators
Australian art curators
Australian women curators
Living people
Australian art critics
Australian women art critics
University of Melbourne women
Recipients of the Medal of the Order of Australia
People from Balwyn, Victoria
Monash University alumni